Đức Trọng is a rural district (huyện) of Lâm Đồng province in the Central Highlands region of Vietnam. Đức Trọng is located at the center of Lâm Đồng Province. Liên Nghĩa Town (thị trấn), the district capital, is 30 km to the south of Đà Lạt. National Highway No. 20 (Đà Lạt - Hồ Chí Minh City) and National Highway No. 27 (Đà Lạt - Ban Mê Thuột) run through the district. It also has two highways connecting Đà Lạt and the central coastal provinces.

The district is subdivided into one town (Liên Nghĩa) and 13 communes (xã): Hiệp Thạnh, Hiệp An, Liên Hiệp, Bình Thạnh, N'Thôl Hạ, Tân Hội, Tân Thành, Phú Hội, Ninh Gia, Tà Hine, Ninh Loan, Đà Loan, and Tà Năng.

Pongour Waterfall, well known as "Seven-Floor Fall" (Thác Bảy Tầng) or "the First Waterfall of the South" (Nam thiên đệ nhất thác) is an attractive tourist site of Đức Trọng.

As of 2003 the district had a population of 161,232. The district covers an area of 902 km2. The district capital lies at Liên Nghĩa.

References

Districts of Lâm Đồng province